is a Japanese voice actress. Her biggest role was in the anime The Wallflower where she voiced Sunako Nakahara. Other major roles include Soreto in Fantastic Children, Setsuko Ohara in Super Robot Wars Z,  Vante in Queen's Blade: Rebellion, and Miyako Yamashina in We Without Wings.

External links
  at Kenyu Office 
 Yukiko Takaguchi at GamePlaza Haruka Voice Acting Database 

1974 births
Living people
Japanese voice actresses